Johannes Brahms' String Quintet No. 1 in F major, Op. 88, was composed in 1882 in the spa town of Bad Ischl, Upper Austria, and published by the firm of Fritz Simrock.  It was first performed at a chamber music evening in Frankfurt on 29 December 1882.

It is a "viola quintet" in that it is scored for string quartet with a second viola. Brahms composed the work in three movements:

Brahms described the quintet to his friend Clara Schumann as "one of [his] finest works" and told Simrock, "You have never before had such a beautiful work from me."

References

External links

Detailed listening guide using the recording by the Amadeus Quartet with Cecil Aronowitz
Score editions, including an edition for piano four hands, Brahms-Institut

Chamber music by Johannes Brahms
1882 compositions
Brahms Quintet 1
Compositions in F major